The Clarion angelfish (Holacanthus clarionensis) is a species of marine ray-finned fish, a marine angelfish belonging to the family Pomacanthidae. It is found in the eastern Pacific Ocean, almost exclusively near islands off the Pacific coast of Mexico.

Description 
The Clarion angelfish has a laterally compressed, quadrilateral body. It has a small mouth which is equipped with bristle like teeth. The juveniles have an overall colour of yellowish-orange on the body and fins; the body is marked with a number of blue vertical bars which fade and, eventually, disappear as the fish matures. The juveniles may also have blue lips and blue margins on the dorsal and anal fins. The adults have a brownish face, with the adjacent part of the body behind reddish orange and the posterior body being browner. The dorsal and anal fins are bright orange while the caudal fin is vermilion. The dorsal fin contains 14 spines and 17-19 soft rays while the anal fin has 3 spines and 19-19 soft rays.

Distribution
The Clarion angelfish has a very limited range in the Eastern Pacific Ocean, being largely restricted to the Revillagigedo Islands of Mexico. Vagrants have occasionally been reported from the southern tip of Baja California and the southeastern part of the Gulf of California, as well as Clipperton Island, a French territory.

Habitat and biology 
They are typically encountered as either solitary individuals or in shoals. It is a little studied species.

Systematics
The Clarion angelfish was first formally described in 1890 by the American ichthyologist Charles Henry Gilbert (1859-1928), with the type locality given as Clarion, Socorro and San Benedicto Islands in the Revillagigedo Islands, western Mexico. The specific name refers to Clarion Island.

Utilisation
The Clarion angelfish was formerly collected for the aquarium trade, but since the Revillagigedo Islands were declared a protected area collection has been illegal. It has, however, been bred in captivity and captive bred specimens have entered the trade.

Earl Stannard Herald
The American ichthyologist and television presenter Earl Stannard Herald (b. 1914) died on 16 January 1973 of a heart attack while he was scuba diving while twitching this species.  Two weeks earlier, on 2 January, other divers had reported seeing the Clarion angelfish at Cabo San Lucas.

References

External links
 

clarionensis
Taxa named by Charles Henry Gilbert
Fish described in 1891